Cogne (Issime ) is a town and comune (municipality) in Aosta Valley, northern Italy, with 1369 inhabitants, as of 2017.

Geography

Cogne is located in the valley with the same name along a stream known as the Torrent Grand Eyvia. It is the largest municipality in the Aosta Valley.

The town center of Cogne, called "Veulla" (meaning "town center" in the local Arpitan language), is surrounded by four valleys:
 South: the Valnontey valley, which leads to the slopes of Gran Paradiso;
 North: the Grauson valley;
 South-east, the Urtier valley and Valleille;
 East, the Gimillan valley.

A large meadow, known as the St Ursus Meadow (It. Prati di Sant'Orso; Fr. Prés de Saint-Ours), is located at the southern edge of the town center (webcam); the municipal statute forbids any construction works on this meadow, which has received recognition as a "Wonder of Italy".

History
The population of Cogne originates from the Arpitane valleys of the Piedmont region. In the past, economic relations, and trade routes were directed to these valleys, using muletracks and mountain passes, like the Rancio Pass or the Arietta Pass. The economic influence of the Aosta Valley is more recent.

Until the 1970s, Cogne was an important mining center for the extraction of iron ore. The main mineral veins were exploited in the mines of Colonne, Licony e Larsinaz. The ore (mainly magnetite) was transported for processing to the Cogne steel plant in Aosta using a narrow gauge railway. The mines were closed in 1979.

Sport
There are also  of downhill runs, many walks on the snow and more than 140 icefalls.
During the summer, hiking and mountain biking are popular.

Main sights
Ibex, wild goat, marmots, royal eagles are easy to see. Many walks and hikes of different level, to lakes, waterfalls and other natural attraction.
 Paradisia Alpine Botanical Garden, an alpine botanical garden

Crime 
Cogne was the seat of the Cogne Homicide.

References

External links

 
Cities and towns in Aosta Valley
Ski areas and resorts in Italy